Ghubbah (alt. Gubba or Ghoba) is a village on the main island of Socotra, Yemen in the Hidaybu District. Located at the north-west coast halfway between Hadibu and Qulensya, it is situated on a barren coralline plateau 5 m above sea level.
The settlement has a cenote located between its Awdaf neighbourhood and the sea. It is of deep blue colour and has an oval measurement of 50 m x 40 m and is 37 m deep. Fresh water feeds into it from the sea.

Another water pool is located just south of the main road bypassing the village. It is a brackish and muddy salty sink hole of larger dimensions, 120 m x 90 m but barely 2 m deep. On the shallow surrounding ledges the villagers have built small salt evaporation pans for salt winning. This water pool is also dubbed Socotra Crater as some scholars hold that it is a meteor crater. But this theory is controversial.

In the area of Ghubbah are ongoing initiatives to replant and to restore Grey Mangroves.

References

Populated places in Socotra
Socotra Governorate